The second Wüst cabinet is the current state government of North Rhine-Westphalia, sworn in on 29 June 2022 after Hendrik Wüst was elected as Minister-President of North Rhine-Westphalia by the members of the Landtag of North Rhine-Westphalia. It is the 26th Cabinet of North Rhine-Westphalia.

It was formed after the 2022 North Rhine-Westphalia state election by the Christian Democratic Union (CDU) and Alliance 90/The Greens (GRÜNE). Excluding the Minister-President, the cabinet comprises twelve ministers. Eight are members of the CDU and four are members of the Greens.

Formation 
The previous cabinet was a coalition government of the CDU and Free Democratic Party (FDP) led by Minister-President Hendrik Wüst of the CDU, who took office in October 2021.

The election took place on 15 May 2022, and resulted in small gains for the CDU and major losses for the FDP. The opposition Social Democratic Party (SPD) recorded a decline, while the Greens almost tripled their vote share to 18% and moved into third place. Overall, the incumbent coalition lost its majority.

After the election, the CDU and SPD both held exploratory discussions with the Greens, who held the balance of power and could form a government with either the CDU or the SPD and FDP. However, the FDP refused talks in the belief that a CDU–Green government was a foregone conclusion. With no other options available, the Greens voted to initiate coalition talks with the CDU, who reciprocated on 29 May. Negotiations began on 31 May. 

The CDU and Greens presented their coalition agreement on 23 June. It was approved near-unanimously by a CDU conference on 25 June. The same day, it passed the Greens congress with 85%. There were objections from members who criticised the proposed separation of the agriculture portfolio from the environment ministry, as well as the state Green Youth, who rejected the prospect of coalition with the CDU outright on the basis that it could not sufficiently address pressing issues such as climate change, affordability, and rent and housing.

Wüst was elected as Minister-President by the Landtag on 28 June, winning 106 votes out of 180 cast. His new cabinet was sworn in the next day.

Composition

External links

References 

Politics of North Rhine-Westphalia
State governments of Germany
Cabinets established in 2022
2022 establishments in Germany
German state cabinets